Dimitri Houbron (12 February 1991) is a French politician of Agir who served as a member of the French National Assembly from 2017 to 2022, representing the 17th constituency of the department of Nord.

Political career
In parliament, Houbron served on the Committee on Legal Affairs. In this capacity, he was his parliamentary group's co-rapporteur (alongside Alexandra Louis) on a 2018 bill against sexual and gender based violence.

In addition to his committee assignments, Houbron was part of the French delegation to the Inter-Parliamentary Union (IPU). He was also a substitute member of the French delegation to the Parliamentary Assembly of the Council of Europe (PACE) from 2019, where he served on the Committee on the Election of Judges to the European Court of Human Rights and the Committee on Equality and Non-Discrimination.

In July 2019, Houbron voted in favor of the French ratification of the European Union’s Comprehensive Economic and Trade Agreement (CETA) with Canada.

See also
 2017 French legislative election

References

1991 births
Living people
Deputies of the 15th National Assembly of the French Fifth Republic
La République En Marche! politicians
Place of birth missing (living people)
Agir (France) politicians
21st-century French politicians